Chapeltown may refer to:

Chapeltown, Lancashire, a village in the borough of Blackburn with Darwen
Chapeltown, South Yorkshire, a suburb of Sheffield
Chapeltown, Leeds, a suburb of Leeds
Chapeltown, County Kerry, a village on Valentia Island

See also
Chapelton (disambiguation)
Chapeltoun, estate in East Ayrshire, Scotland